Thomas Edwin Glascock (born December 1, 1932) is an American attorney and Democratic politician who served in the Virginia House of Delegates from 1982 to 1983. While in the House, he was one of thirty-five delegates who voted for a resolution to bring the Equal Rights Amendment to the floor. In 1985, he ran in the 92nd district but was defeated by Independent candidate Mary T. Christian, who went on to be reelected as a Democrat eight times.

References

External links
 

1932 births
Living people
Democratic Party members of the Virginia House of Delegates
Hampden–Sydney College alumni
University of Virginia School of Law alumni
People from Marshall, Virginia